Jake Newton (born September 22, 1988) is an American professional ice hockey defenseman. He is currently playing for Storhamar in the Norwegian GET-ligaen.

Playing career
Upon completing his freshman year in 2009–10 with Northeastern University and selected to the Hockey East All-Rookie Team, Newton was signed as an undrafted free-agent to a three-year entry level contract with the Anaheim Ducks on March 17, 2010. He was traded to the Colorado Avalanche from the Anaheim Ducks along with a conditional draft pick for defenseman Kyle Cumiskey on October 8, 2011. He was then immediately assigned to AHL affiliate, the Lake Erie Monsters before finishing the 2011–12 season with the Avalanche's secondary affiliate, the Allen Americans of the Central Hockey League.

On August 29, 2012, Newton signed as a free agent to his first European contract with a one-year deal with HC Eppan Pirates of the Italian second division Serie A2. During the 2012–13 season, Newton scored an impressive 41 points in 45 games, to help the Pirates win the Championships and was selected as the League's best player.

On July 26, 2013, Newton returned to North America and signed a one-year ECHL contract with the Ontario Reign. During the 2013–14 season he made a return to the AHL when he was loaned to the Bridgeport Sound Tigers for 18 games.

Newton decided to continue his professional career again in Italy, signing a one-year contract with Serie A outfit, HC Gherdëina on August 20, 2014. In the 2014–15 season, Newton excelled as Gherdëina's best player, contributing with 24 goals and 52 points in 39 games to lead the league in both categories in scoring from the blueline.  After Gherdëina's elimination in the Quarter-finals, Newton signed a one-year contract with Finnish Liiga club, Sport on March 7, 2015.

In the 2015–16 season, Newton adapted quickly to the pace of the Liiga, contributing to Sports' blueline with 9 goals and 24 points from 58 games in Vaasa. After two seasons abroad, Newton opted to return to North America, securing a one-year deal with ECHL outfit, the Idaho Steelheads, on September 8, 2016. Newton was released from his contract with the Steelheads prior to the season, after agreeing to a one-year deal in the Czech Republic with Mountfield HK on October 4, 2016.

Into the 2018–19 season, Newton continued his playing career in agreeing to terms with the Bayreuth Tigers of the DEL2 on November 5, 2018. He played in 13 games with the Tigers for 10 points, before joining the Thomas Sabo Ice Tigers for the Spengler Cup. On January 2, 2019, Newton opted to return to close out the season in a second stint with JYP of the Liiga.

As a free agent, Newton opted to sign a one-year contract with newly promoted Swedish club, IK Oskarshamn of the SHL, on May 22, 2019.

Family
Newton's older brother Josh played in the ECHL with the San Diego Gulls during the 2005–06 season.

Career statistics

Awards and honors

References

External links

1988 births
Allen Americans players
American men's ice hockey defensemen
EHC Bayreuth players
Bridgeport Sound Tigers players
Ice hockey players from California
JYP Jyväskylä players
KooKoo players
Lake Erie Monsters players
Lincoln Stars players
Living people
Stadion Hradec Králové players
Northeastern Huskies men's ice hockey players
Ontario Reign (ECHL) players
People from San Jacinto, California
Storhamar Dragons players
Syracuse Crunch players
Vaasan Sport players
American expatriate ice hockey players in Finland
American expatriate ice hockey players in Italy
American expatriate ice hockey players in the Czech Republic
American expatriate ice hockey players in Germany
American expatriate ice hockey players in Norway
American expatriate ice hockey players in Sweden